Menna Shalabi, also spelled Shalaby (born Mennah Hesham Shalabi on 24 July 1981) is an Egyptian actress featured in numerous cinema and TV productions, among them the TV series Every Week Has a Friday.

Awards 
Menna Shalabi is the first Arab Egyptian actress to be nominated for Emmy Awards.

Controversy 
On 25 November 2022, she was arrested at Cairo International Airport for her possession of substances including Marijuana, after returning from New York City. However, she was released shortly after paying a bail of LE50K. In January 2023, she was sentenced to one year in prison with suspension, due to obtaining illegal substances with the intention of using them.

See also
Cinema of Egypt

References

External links 

Egyptian television actresses
Egyptian film actresses
21st-century Egyptian actresses
Living people
1982 births
People from Giza